White Dwarf is a magazine published by British games manufacturer Games Workshop, which has long served as a promotions and advertising platform for Games Workshop and Citadel Miniatures products.

During the first ten years of its publication, it covered a wide variety of fantasy and science-fiction role-playing games (RPGs) and board games, particularly the role playing games Advanced Dungeons & Dragons (AD&D), Call of Cthulhu, RuneQuest and Traveller. These games were all published by other games companies and distributed in the United Kingdom by Games Workshop stores. The magazine underwent a major change in style and content in the late 1980s. It is now dedicated exclusively to the miniature wargames produced by Games Workshop.

History

1975: Owl and Weasel to White Dwarf
Steve Jackson and Ian Livingstone initially produced a newsletter called Owl and Weasel, which ran for twenty-five issues from February 1975 before it evolved into White Dwarf.

Originally scheduled for May/June 1977, White Dwarf was first published one month later. According to Shannon Appelcline, "Issue #1 ... was a 20-page magazine printed on glossy stock with a two-color cover." The magazine had a bimonthly schedule, with an initial (and speculative) print run of 4,000. White Dwarf continued the fantasy and science fiction role-playing and board-gaming theme developed in Owl and Weasel. Due to the increase in available space, there was an opportunity to produce reviews, articles and scenarios to a greater depth than had been possible in Owl and Weasel.

Early 1980s: as a general RPG periodical

During the early 1980s the magazine focused mainly on the 'big three' role playing games of the time: Advanced Dungeons & Dragons, RuneQuest, and Traveller.

In addition to this a generation of writers passed through its offices and onto other RPG projects in the next decade, such as Phil Masters and Marcus L. Rowland. One huge attraction of the magazine was its incorporation of mini-game scenarios, capable of completion in a single night's play, rather than the mega-marathon games typical of the off the shelf campaigns. This would often be in the form of an attractive and interesting single task for either existing or new characters to resolve. These could either be slipped into existing campaign plots, or be used stand-alone, just for a fun evening, and were easily grasped by those familiar with RPG rules.

During this period the magazine included many features such as the satirical comic strip Thrud the Barbarian and Dave Langford's "Critical Mass" book review column, as well as a comical advertising series "The Androx Diaries", and always had cameos and full scenarios for a broad selection of the most popular games of the time, as well as a more rough and informal editorial style.

Mid-1980s: house magazine of Games Workshop

In the mid-late 1980s, however, there was a repositioning from being a general periodical covering all aspects and publishers within the hobby niche to a focus almost exclusively on Games Workshop's own products and publications. The last Dungeons & Dragons article appeared in issue 93, with the changeover being complete by issue #102. In this respect it took over some of the aspects of the Citadel Journal, an intermittent publication that supported the Warhammer Fantasy Battle game. The magazine has always been a conduit for new rules and ideas for GW games as well as a means to showcase developments. It often includes scenarios, campaigns, hobby news, photos of recently released miniatures and tips on building terrain and constructing or converting miniatures.

Grombrindal the White Dwarf is also a special character for the Warhammer Dwarf army, whose rules are published only in certain issues of White Dwarf (being revamped for the most recent edition of the rules). It is never stated who exactly the White Dwarf is, but it is implied that he is the spirit of Snorri Whitebeard, the last king of the Dwarfs to receive respect from an Elf. The image of the White Dwarf has graced the cover of many issues of the magazine. The image was also used on the character sheet for the Dwarf character in HeroQuest.

In December 2004, White Dwarf published its 300th issue in the United Kingdom and North America. Each issue contained many special "freebies" as well as articles on the history of the magazine and the founding of Games Workshop.

The monthly battle reports are a regular feature. Battle reports detail a battle between two or more forces, usually with their own specific victory conditions. The reports follow the gamers through their army selection, tactics and deployment, through the battle to their respective conclusions. The format varies, ranging from a simplified, generalized style to a more detailed and visual style.

The page count of the US and UK publications was substantially different (for example, bearing in mind the US/UK numbering difference: issue US #319, 156 pages; UK #320, 132 pages) with substantial differences in actual amount of content (for example in the same issues: US, 114 pages; UK, 71 pages) and each magazine had substantial overlap with the other as well as unique articles.

Recent years
In June 2010 Andrew Kenrick replaced Mark Latham as editor. Kenrick had previously been sub-editor, as well as sub-editing other Games Workshop material such as the most recent edition of Codex: Space Marines.

As of the October 2012 issue, White Dwarf was redesigned with a new 9 member production staff with Matthew Hutson, Kris Shield and Andrew Kenrick continuing from the previous version and 6 new members including Jes Bickham as the new editor. Bickham had previously edited the Battle Games in Middle-earth magazine.

White Dwarf continued to be published on a monthly basis until issue #409, January 2014. On 1 February 2014, the magazine moved to a 32 page format, published weekly and renumbered from issue 1. Warhammer Visions, a monthly sister title, was launched at the same time, in a format favouring the imagery over text. The weekly version of White Dwarf lasted for 131 issues and in September 2016 the magazine returned to its monthly format, also subsuming Warhammer Visions.

Spinoffs

In the early 1980s, mail-order subscriber copies of White Dwarf also received a small (A5, black and white) companion magazine Black Sun edited by Steve Williams, with contributions from White Dwarf regulars such as Ian Marsh and Games Workshop staff; it offered parodies, extended reviews, humour and gaming news.

During the late 1980s the Black Sun was rekindled, this time written, illustrated and produced by Tim Pollard (with occasional contributions from other GW authors such as Andy Chambers). It contained very informal 'inside' information from the Citadel Mail Order Department, news, game reviews, articles and competitions as well as a short lived cartoon serial. Some new rules for then current GW products also debuted in Black Sun.

GW's US studio also ran for a while a biweekly online supplemental free e-zine Black Gobbo. It included two regular columns, "Rules of Engagement" and "Ask the Scenery Guy", to help answer gamers' questions. Similar to its printed counterpart, it was devoted to the games and hobbies created by GW. Just like its printed counterpart, Black Gobbo also has its own character, published on the web with its own article, rules, and modelling tips. The name is a pun. Gobbo stands for Goblin, which is hated by the Dwarfs. Dwarfs are, likewise, hated by Goblins. Black is also the opposite of white, hence Black Gobbo is the exact opposite of White Dwarf; one being free, electronic, short, weekly, black and a Goblin while the other one cost something, printed, comparatively long, monthly, white, and a Dwarf. The e-zine was cancelled in 2008 during the revision of GW's online strategy.

White Dwarf global editors

Note: During Jes Bickham's period as editor White Dwarf went weekly for a few years, then returned to being monthly but was no longer officially numbered. Those marked with stars indicate guest editorship.

See also
 Battle Games in Middle Earth
 Warlock (magazine)

Notes

References

Bibliography

External links 
 Index to White Dwarf — browsable index by topic, covers #1-100, The Best of White Dwarf Articles #1 to #3, and The Best of White Dwarf Scenarios  #3

Games Workshop
Wargaming magazines
Game magazines published in the United Kingdom
Role-playing game magazines
Fighting Fantasy
Magazines established in 1977
1977 establishments in the United Kingdom
Monthly magazines published in the United Kingdom
Middle-earth Strategy Battle Game
Weekly magazines published in the United Kingdom
Magazines published in London